Tan Sri Datuk Dr. Yusof Basiron (born 20 June 1948) is a scientist and an influential public figure in the Malaysian palm oil industry. He was the CEO of the Malaysian Palm Oil Council (MPOC), and a non-independent non-executive director on the board of Sime Darby.

Education
Basiron earned his bachelor's degree in chemical engineering at the University of Canterbury in New Zealand in 1972. He also has multiple post-graduate degrees, including a PhD degree in applied economics and management science from the University of Stirling in Scotland completed in 1986.

Career

In 1979, Basiron joined the Palm Oil Research Institute of Malaysia (PORIM) and later became their director-general in 1992. He continued to serve as director-general of the Malaysian Palm Oil Board (MPOB) when it was formed in April of 2000, through a merger of PORIM and the Palm Oil Registration and Licensing Authority (PORLA). He left his position as director-general of the MPOB in 2006 and served as CEO of the Malaysian Palm Oil Council (MPOC).

Awards and recognition
In 2017, Basiron was conferred "Leadership Award" for his contribution as CEO at the annual Malaysian Palm Oil Council (MPOC) Leadership Awards.

References

External links
 

Living people
1948 births
Malaysian scientists
Malaysian businesspeople
Palm oil production in Malaysia
Malaysian people of Malay descent
Malaysian Muslims
People from Negeri Sembilan